Kaliyuga Kannan is a 1974 Indian Tamil-language comedy drama film directed by Krishnan–Panju. It is based on the play Sri Krishna Vijayam written by Vaali. The film stars Sowcar Janaki, Jaishankar, Jayachitra and Thengai Srinivasan. It was released on 13 November 1974 and emerged a commercial success. The film was later remade in Telugu as  Devudu Digivaste (1975), in Kannada as Devara Duddu (1977), and in Hindi as Yehi Hai Zindagi (1977).

Plot 

Kaliyuga Kannan is a drama of faith and disbelief in God of a middle-aged couple. While Sambu Iyer's wife's character played by Janaki is a devotee of Krishna, Sambu Iyer questions God's partiality and judgement. He happens to spend the money his wife had kept aside for God as a offering and on a competition which he wins and uses to become rich.

When the lord himself appears and asks for that money, he keeps putting off the return of the money taking credit for his success while blaming the lord for his failures. In the end, he concedes and acknowledges that God is fair, money is root of all evil and reconciles with God at the time of his death.

Cast 
 Sowcar Janaki as Sambu Iyer's wife
 Jaishankar as Sambu's son
 Jayachitra as Radha
 V. K. Ramasamy as Radha's father
 Neelakantan as Krishnan
 Thengai Srinivasan as Sambu Iyer

Production 
Kaliyuga Kannan is the inaugural production of Ajantha Enterprises, and is an adaptation of Sri Krishna Vijayam, a play written by Vaali that featured Thengai Srinivasan as the protagonist. The play, which was written for actor V. Gopalakrishnan's Gopi Theatres, intended to convey the message that "money could not buy peace of mind". When adapting the play as a film, the makers wanted Sivaji Ganesan to star. But Ganesan suggested Srinivasan, after being impressed with his performance in the play. Vaali wrote the dialogue for the film adaptation, which was produced by N. Elango. Cinematography was handled by S. Maruti Rao. Besides directing, Panju co-edited the film (alongside Narasimhan) under the pseudonym "Panjabi". The final cut of the film measured .

Soundtrack 
The soundtrack was composed by V. Kumar, while the lyrics were written by Vaali. The playback singers were T. M. Soundararajan, S. P. Balasubrahmanyam, P. Susheela and Renuka. The songs featured were "Kannaiah", "Kadhal Ponnedu", "Jaichutte" and "Seven O'Clock".

Release and reception 
Kaliyuga Kannan was released on 13 November 1974. Kanthan of Kalki appreciated the film for Janaki's performance and Vaali's writing, calling it a good entertainer. The film emerged a commercial success.

Legacy 
Kaliyuga Kannan propelled Srinivasan to stardom. CV Aravind of The News Minute praised it for the "riveting script by Vaali". Playwright and comedian Crazy Mohan developed a desire to write a play with "God as the fulcrum" after watching the play Krishnaya Thubhyam Namaha, and Kaliyuga Kannan encouraged him to solidify his plans, resulting in the play Chocolate Krishna.

References

External links 
 

1970s Tamil-language films
1974 comedy-drama films
1974 films
Films directed by Krishnan–Panju
Films scored by V. Kumar
Hindu devotional films
Indian comedy-drama films
Indian films based on plays
Tamil films remade in other languages